The 1986–87 Montreal Canadiens season was the team's 78th season. The season involved being eliminated in the Prince of Wales Conference Final versus the Philadelphia Flyers 4 games to 2, in a series made famous by the pre-game brawl before game 6, after Ed Hospodar attacked Claude Lemieux for shooting a puck into the Flyers empty net at the end of the warmup

Offseason

NHL Draft
Montreal's draft picks at the 1986 NHL Entry Draft held at the Montreal Forum in Montreal, Quebec.

Regular season

Final standings

Schedule and results

Player statistics

Regular season
Scoring

Goaltending

Playoffs
Scoring

Goaltending

Playoffs

References
 Canadiens on Hockey Database
 Canadiens on NHL Reference

Montreal Canadiens seasons
Montreal Canadiens season, 1986-87
Montreal